Tylstrup is a railway town at the Vendsyssel railway line.

References
 

Cities and towns in the North Jutland Region
Towns and settlements in Aalborg Municipality